First Lady of Senegal (French: Première Dame du Sénégal) is the title attributed to the wife of the president of Senegal. The country's current first lady is Marieme Faye Sall, wife of President Macky Sall, who had held the position since April 2, 2012. There has been no first gentleman of Senegal to date.

History
Senegal's inaugural first lady, Colette Hubert Senghor, wife of President Léopold Sédar Senghor, was from France. The country's second first lady, Elizabeth Diouf, is the daughter of a Lebanese father and a Senegalese mother. Like Colette Senghor, Viviane Wade, Senegal's third first lady, is an ethnic French woman from France.

Marieme Faye Sall, who has held the position since 2012, is the country's first black first lady, as well as the first fully Senegalese-born and raised first lady.

First ladies of Senegal

See also
 Senegal
 President of Senegal
 List of colonial governors of Senegal
 Politics of Senegal
 Lists of office-holders

References

External links

First Lady of Senegal 

Senegal